Antennaerenea is a genus of beetles in the family Cerambycidae, containing a single species, Antennaerenea niveosignata. It was described by Breuning in 1980.

References

Compsosomatini
Beetles described in 1980
Monotypic Cerambycidae genera